Participatory economics, often abbreviated Parecon, is an economic system based on participatory decision making as the primary economic mechanism for allocation in society. In the system, the say in decision-making is proportional to the impact on a person or group of people. Participatory economics is a form of socialist decentralized planned economy involving the common ownership of the means of production. It is a proposed alternative to contemporary capitalism and centralized planning. This economic model is primarily associated with political theorist Michael Albert and economist Robin Hahnel, who describes participatory economics as an anarchist economic vision.

The underlying values that parecon seeks to implement are equity, solidarity, diversity, workers' self-management, efficiency (defined as accomplishing goals without wasting valued assets) and sustainability. The institutions of parecon include workers' and consumers' councils utilising self-managerial methods for decision-making, balanced job complexes, remuneration based on individual effort, and wide decentralized planning.

Decision-making principle 

In parecon, self-management constitutes a replacement for the mainstream conception of economic freedom, which Albert and Hahnel argue by its very vagueness has allowed it to be abused by capitalist ideologues. In their councils, workers deliberate over plans regarding the productive enterprise and employ whichever voting scheme best instantiates the principle that each worker's decision-making power ought to be in proportion to the impact upon them of the particular decision being voted on. Generally, a workers' council is not constrained to adopt a single threshold (i.e. 50%+1) to pass their resolutions, but can tailor their voting procedures to reflect the variation in impact of the enterprise's decisions.

Work and distribution

Balanced job complexes 

A main goal of socialism is to create a society without classes, and traditional socialist thinking identifies classes based on ownership of the means of production (in capitalism, those are the capitalist class and the proletarian class). However, Albert and Hahnel identify a third class created by the particular division of labor. Some tasks and jobs are more desirable than others; also some are more empowering. Hahnel and Albert argue that empowering jobs, such as accounting or management, provide access to information and skills to formulate ideas and plans for decision making, while other jobs, such as cleaning, do not provide these. Thus workers with disempowering jobs can at best ratify proposals by empowered workers, and have little reason to participate in collective decision making. Workers with empowering jobs are a third class, "coordinator class" that does not own the means of production but has more power than menial workers. This class exists in current and past capitalist, socialist and cooperative economies. Coordinator jobs include political office, management, law, medicine, accounting, and research.

To distribute work equitably and empower all workers in decisions in their workplace, in participatory economics each worker does tasks, which, taken together, result in an average desirability and average empowerment among all workers.

Compensation for effort and sacrifice (principle for distribution) 

Albert and Hahnel argue that it is inequitable and ineffective to compensate people on the basis of luck (e.g. skills or talents that owe to their birth or heredity), or by virtue of workers' productivity (as measured by the value of the goods they produce). Therefore, the primary principle of participatory economics is to reward workers for their effort and sacrifice. For example, mining work—which is dangerous and uncomfortable—would be more highly paid than office work for the same amount of time, thus allowing the miner to work fewer hours for the same pay, and the burden of highly dangerous and strenuous jobs to be shared among the populace.

Additionally, participatory economics would provide exemptions from the compensation for effort principle. People with disabilities who are unable to work, children, the elderly, the infirm and workers who are legitimately in transitional circumstances, can be remunerated according to need. However, every able adult has the obligation to perform some socially useful work as a requirement for receiving reward. However, everyone would be entitled to free health care, education, skills training, and the freedom to choose between various democratically structured workplaces with balanced jobs balanced for desirability and empowerment.

The starting point for the income of all workers in a participatory economy is an equal share of the social product. From this point, incomes for personal expenditures and consumption rights for public goods can be expected to diverge by small degrees, reflecting the choices that individuals make in between work and leisure time, and the level of danger and difficulty of a job as judged by their immediate workplace peers.

Allocation of resource

Participatory planning is the allocation mechanism in a participatory economy, and is meant to provide a workable alternative to market competition and centralized planning. The planning procedure is conceived as an iterative process in which, (1) production proposals made by workers councils and (2) consumption proposals made by individuals and their neighborhood councils, are submitted and revised through multiple rounds of pricing updates until the process converges on a feasible plan for the upcoming year.

The process begins when the facilitation board (see below) announces a list of indicative prices for each final consumer good, as well as for each capital good, natural resource, and category of labor that is available to society. These indicative prices are calculated to reflect the estimated opportunity costs for producing various goods and services, and incorporate both social costs and pollution impacts. In response to this list of prices, individuals draft an annual consumption plan for goods/services they wish to consume in the coming year, and also meet in their neighborhood councils to deliberate and democratically arrive at a plan for the consumption of public goods (e.g. obtaining resources to build a public playground). As workers, individuals also meet in their workplaces to determine what outputs they will produce and what inputs they will consume in the production process, as well as how much they would each like to work. Thus, workers and consumers (as well as any federations of workers or consumers) submit their initial requests to the facilitation board, which aggregates this information.

Because the conclusion of the first round of this process will almost certainly not be a workable plan, the facilitation board proceeds to update the list of indicative prices for each good up or down, in proportion to the excess demand and supply for each, so that the updated prices reflect a more accurate estimate of the social opportunity costs of each item. The announcement of updated indicative prices then initiates the second round of the planning process, in which consumers and workers revise and resubmit their proposals in light of the new information. In particular, consumption proposals in which the individual's proposed effort rating does not warrant the proposed level of consumption will need to be adjusted, so that the individual will either have to reduce his/her consumption requests, shift them to less costly products, or increase his/her projected work-hours for the coming year. Other consumers may discover that their initial proposals were too modest, and can revise their consumption upwards, if they choose, or they can revise their projected effort rating downwards by proposing to work fewer hours and increasing leisure time.

Production proposals are also summarized and evaluated on a quantitative basis, in this case by the ratio of social benefits to social costs. (The social benefit part of the ratio is calculated by multiplying the proposed quantity of outputs from a workplace by their indicative prices, adding negative prices for any proposed pollution emissions and summing. The social costs are calculated by multiplying the quantity of requested inputs by their indicative prices and summing.) Proposals with a benefits-to-cost ratio below one will need to make adjustments in order to gain approval in the next round, either by switching to a less polluting technology, producing a more socially desirable set of outputs, or using less costly inputs.

After receiving the revised proposals, the facilitation board once again updates the list of indicative prices. After several rounds of this revision and resubmission process, the result is convergence to a feasible plan in which workers and consumers are able to accomplish the activities that they detailed in their final submissions. Even after a feasible plan is achieved, flexible mid-year revisions of consumer/worker proposals can also be incorporated into the planning process.

In academic work, Albert and Hahnel prove that participatory planning arrives at a Pareto optimum, and does so under less restrictive assumptions than markets; that is, participatory planning is Pareto optimal even though it incorporates both public goods and externalities, whereas markets do not achieve Pareto optimality with these two assumptions.

A feature of participatory planning which differs from other modes of democratic planning is that all deliberation on proposals occurs within councils, but does not take place between councils. That is, under parecon, a feasible economic plan is constructed due to an iterative adjustment of prices based on the information from councils' self-activity proposals, rather than owing to a procedure of deliberation among delegates from various workplaces/industries. This is potentially desirable by cutting down on the meeting time and bureaucratic burdens needed to converge on an annual plan.

Facilitation boards 

In a proposed participatory economy, key information relevant to converging on an economic plan would be made available by Iteration Facilitation Boards (IFBs), which, based on proposals from worker/consumer councils and economic data, present indicative prices and economic projections at each round of the planning process.

The IFB has no decision-making authority. In theory, the IFB's activity can consist mainly of computers performing the (agreed upon) algorithms for adjusting prices and forecasts, with little human involvement.

Motivations (opposition to central planning and capitalism) 

Robin Hahnel has argued that "participatory planning is not central planning", stating "The procedures are completely different and the incentives are completely different. And one of the important ways in which it is different from central planning is that it is incentive compatible, that is, actors have an incentive to report truthfully rather than an incentive to misrepresent their capabilities or preferences." Unlike historical examples of central planning, the parecon proposal advocates the use and adjustment of price information reflecting marginal social opportunity costs and benefits as integral elements of the planning process. Hahnel has argued emphatically against Milton Friedman's a priori tendency to deny the possibility of alternatives:

Friedman assumes away the best solution for coordinating economic activities. He simply asserts "there are only two ways of coordinating the economic activities of millions—central direction involving the use of coercion—and voluntary cooperation, the technique of the marketplace." [...] a participatory economy can permit all to partake in economic decision making in proportion to the degree they are affected by outcomes. Since a participatory system uses a system of participatory planning instead of markets to coordinate economic activities, Friedman would have us believe that participatory planning must fall into the category of "central direction involving the use of coercion."

Albert and Hahnel have voiced detailed critiques of centrally-planned economies in theory and practice, but are also highly-critical of capitalism. Hahnel claims "the truth is capitalism aggravates prejudice, is the most inequitable economy ever devised, is grossly inefficient—even if highly energetic—and is incompatible with both economic and political democracy. In the present era of free-market triumphalism it is useful to organize a sober evaluation of capitalism responding to Friedman's claims one by one."

Critique of markets 

Mainstream economists largely acknowledge the problem of externalities but believe they can be addressed either through Coasian bargaining or the use of Pigovian taxes—extra taxes on goods that have externalities. According to economic theory, if Pigovian taxes are set so that the after-tax cost of the goods is equal to the social cost of the goods, the direct cost of production plus cost of externalities, then quantities produced will tend toward a socially optimal level. Hahnel observes, "more and more economists outside the mainstream are challenging this assumption, and a growing number of skeptics now dare to suggest that externalities are prevalent, and often substantial". Or, as E.K. Hunt put it: externalities are the rule rather than the exception, and therefore markets often work as if they were guided by a "malevolent invisible foot" that keeps kicking us to produce more of some things, and less of others than is socially efficient."

As long as a market economy is in place, Albert and Hahnel favour Pigovian taxes over other solutions to environmental problems such as command and control, or the issuance of marketable permits. However, Hahnel, who teaches ecological economics at American University, argues that in a market economy businesses try to avoid the "polluter pays principle" by shifting the burden of the costs for their polluting activities to consumers. In terms of incentives, he argues this might be considered a positive development because it would penalize consumers for "dirty" consumption. However, it also has regressive implications since tax incidence studies show that ultimately it would be poor people who would bear a great deal of the burden of many pollution taxes. "In other words, many pollution taxes would be highly regressive and therefore aggravate economic injustice." He, therefore, recommends that pollution taxes be linked to cuts in regressive taxes such as social security taxes.

Hahnel argues that Pigovian taxes, along with associated corrective measures advanced by market economists, ultimately fall far short of adequately or fairly addressing externalities. He argues such methods are incapable of attaining accurate assessments of social costs:

Markets corrected by pollution taxes only lead to the efficient amount of pollution and satisfy the polluter pays principle if the taxes are set equal to the magnitude of the damage victims suffer. But because markets are not incentive compatible for polluters and pollution victims, markets provide no reliable way to estimate the magnitudes of efficient taxes for pollutants. Ambiguity over who has the property right, polluters or pollution victims, free rider problems among multiple victims, and the transaction costs of forming and maintaining an effective coalition of pollution victims, each of whom is affected to a small but unequal degree, all combine to render market systems incapable of eliciting accurate information from pollution victims about the damages they suffer, or acting upon that information even if it were known.

Class and hierarchy 

Advocates of parecon say the intention is that the four main ingredients of parecon be implemented with a minimum of hierarchy and a maximum of transparency in all discussions and decision-making. This model is designed to eliminate secrecy in economic decision-making, and instead encourage friendly cooperation and mutual support. This avoidance of power hierarchies puts parecon in the libertarian socialist political tradition. Stephen Shalom has produced a political system meant to complement parecon, called parpolity.

Although parecon falls under left-wing political tradition, it is designed to avoid the creation of powerful intellectual elites or the rule of a bureaucracy, which is perceived as the major problem of the economies of the communist states of the 20th century. In their book Looking Forward Albert and Hanhel termed this situation 'coordinatorism'. Parecon advocates recognize that monopolization of empowering labor, in addition to private ownership, can be a source of class division. Thus, a three-class view of the economy (capitalists, coordinators, and workers) is stressed, in contrast to the traditional two-class view of Marxism. The coordinator class, emphasized in parecon, refers to those who have a monopoly on empowering skills and knowledge, and corresponds to the doctors, lawyers, managers, engineers, and other professionals in present economies. Parecon advocates argue that, historically, Marxism ignored the ability of coordinators to become a new ruling class in a post-capitalist society.

Innovation
Hahnel has also written a detailed discussion of parecon's desirability compared to capitalism with respect to incentives to innovate. In capitalism, patent laws, intellectual property rights and barriers to market entry are institutional features that reward individual innovators while limiting the use of new technologies. Hahnel notes that, in contrast, "in a participatory economy all innovations will immediately be made available to all enterprises, so there will never be any loss of static efficiency.". Innovation is sometimes the outcome of cumulative creativity, which pareconomists believe may not be legitimately attributed to individuals.

Limitations
Participatory economics is not in itself intended to provide a general political system. Its practical implementation would depend on an accompanying political system.

According to Albert and Hahnel, parecon addresses only an alternative economic theory and must be accompanied by equally important alternatives in the fields of politics, culture and kinship. The authors have also discussed elements of anarchism in the field of politics, polyculturalism in the field of culture, and feminism in the field of family and gender relations as being possible foundations for future alternative visions in these other spheres of society; the totality of such changes is often referred to as 'participatory society'. Stephen R. Shalom has begun work on a participatory political vision he calls "parpolity".

Criticism 

David Schweickart suggests participatory economics would be undesirable even if it was possible:

It is a system obsessed with comparison (Is your job complex more empowering than mine?), with monitoring (You are not working at average intensity, mate—get with the program), with the details of consumption (How many rolls of toilet paper will I need next year? Why are some of my neighbors still using the kind not made of recycled paper?)

Other criticism raised by Schweickart include:
 Difficulty with creating balanced job complexes and ensuring they do not suffer from inefficiency.
 A system based on peer evaluation may not work as workers could slack off and there would be little incentive for colleagues to damage their relationships by giving them bad reviews. Alternatively it may cause workers to become suspicious of one another, undermining solidarity.
 A compensation system based on effort would be difficult to measure and would need to be based on an average rating system of effort.
 Parecon's compensation system would be overly egalitarian and likely cause resentment among workers who work harder while also discouraging them from putting in extra effort since they will gain no greater compensation.
 Parecon would likely produce an onerous and tiresome requirement to list off all things people want produced, which would likely suffer from uncertainty given people do not always know what they desire, as well as issues with how much information they should be required to supply and complexities with the negotiations required between worker and consumer councils.

Planning 

Participatory economics would create a large amount of administrative work for individual workers, who would have to plan their consumption in advance, and a new bureaucratic class. Proponents of parecon argue that capitalist economies are hardly free of bureaucracy or meetings, and a parecon would eliminate banks, advertising, stock market, tax returns and long-term financial planning. Albert and Hahnel claim that it is probable that a similar number of workers will be involved in a parecon bureaucracy as in a capitalist bureaucracy, with much of the voting achieved by computer rather than meeting, and those who are not interested in the collective consumption proposals not required to attend.

Critics suggest that proposals require consideration of an unfeasibly large set of policy choices, and that lessons from planned societies show that peoples' daily needs cannot be established well in advance simply by asking people what they want. Albert and Hahnel note that markets themselves hardly adjust prices instantaneously, and suggest that in a participatory economy facilitation boards could modify prices on a regular basis. According to Hahnel these act according to democratically decided guidelines, can be composed of members from other regions and are impossible to bribe due to parecon's non-transferable currency. However, Takis Fotopoulos argues that "no kind of economic organisation based on planning alone, however democratic and decentralized it is, can secure real self-management and freedom of choice."

Loss of efficiency 

Parecon might reduce efficiency in the workplace. For one, expert and exceptional workers (e.g. exceptional surgeons and scientists) would not be performing their tasks full-time. Participatory economics would expect them to share in "disempowering work" and would not offer opportunities to seek additional compensation for their high ability or finding solutions to problems. In a lecture at Willamette University in Oregon in 2015, Hahnel responded to this criticism by explaining that these jobs could be filled by machines, which are underutilized in capitalist economic systems due to the lowered rates of profit, and also division of labor would not exist under a participatory economic system as much as it does under capitalism, so people would not always have the same jobs.

Theodore Burczak argues that it is impossible for workers to give the unbiased assessments of the "largely unobservable" characteristics of effort proposed as the basis for salary levels, and the absence of market exchange mechanisms likewise makes calculating social costs of production and consumption impossible.

See also 

 Anarchist economics
 Anarcho-syndicalism
 Collaborative e-democracy
 Co-operative
 Economic democracy
 Inclusive Democracy
 Libertarian municipalism
 Participatory politics
 Social justice

References

Further reading
 A Quiet Revolution In Welfare Economics, Albert and Hahnel, Princeton University Press, 1990.
 Looking Forward: Participatory Economics for the Twenty First Century, Albert and Hahnel, South End Press, 1991.
 The Political Economy of Participatory Economics, Albert and Hahnel, Princeton University Press, 1991.
 Moving Forward: Program for a Participatory Economy, Albert, AK Press, 1997.
 Parecon: Life After Capitalism, Albert, Verso Books, 2003.
 Economic Justice And Democracy: From Competition To Cooperation, Hahnel, Routledge, 2005.
 Realizing Hope: Life Beyond Capitalism, Albert, Zed Press, 2006.
 Real Utopia: Participatory Society for the 21st Century, Chris Spannos (Ed.), AK Press, 2008.
 Takis Fotopoulos (2003), Inclusive Democracy and Participatory Economics, Democracy & Nature, Volume 9, Issue 3 November 2003, pp. 401–25 – a comparison with Inclusive Democracy
 Rameez Rahman, Michel Meulpolder, David Hales, Johan Pouwelse, Henk Sips (2009), "Revisiting Social Welfare in P2P", Delft University of Technology Report. – applying Participatory Economics principles to analysis of peer-to-peer computing systems

Anarchist economic schools
Criticism of intellectual property
Economic democracy
Economic ideologies
Economic planning
Economic systems
Economics
Social anarchism
Socialism